Varvara Mestnikova (born 6 May 1995) is a Russian chess player who holds the title of Women FIDE Master (WFM) (2005).

Biography
Varvara Mestnikova was student of Sakhalin chess school, later moved to Voronezh. In 2005, in Herceg Novi Varvara Mestnikova won European Youth Chess Championship in the U10 girl's age group. About this success she became Women FIDE Master (WFM) title. Since 2008, she rarely participate in chess tournaments.

In 2016 Varvara Mestnikova graduated from Saint Petersburg Herzen University.

References

External links
Varvara Mestnikova chess games at 365chess.com

1995 births
Living people
Russian female chess players
Chess Woman FIDE Masters